Cloak and Cipher is the second full-length album by Canadian indie rock band Land of Talk, released August 24, 2010, on Saddle Creek Records.

The album features special guests including Patrick Watson as well as members of Stars, Thee Silver Mt. Zion, Wintersleep, The Besnard Lakes, Arcade Fire and Esmerine.

The album was named as a longlisted nominee for the 2011 Polaris Music Prize.

Track listing

References 

2010 albums
Land of Talk albums
Saddle Creek Records albums